Artem Viktorovych Syomka (born 18 February 1998) is a Ukrainian professional footballer who plays as a left winger for Ukrainian club Hirnyk-Sport Horishni Plavni.

References

External links
 
 
 

1998 births
Living people
Place of birth missing (living people)
Ukrainian footballers
Association football forwards
FC Arsenal-Kyivshchyna Bila Tserkva players
FC Zirka Kropyvnytskyi players
FC Hirnyk Kryvyi Rih players
FC Lokomotiv Yerevan players
FC Peremoha Dnipro players
FC Hirnyk-Sport Horishni Plavni players
Ukrainian Premier League players
Ukrainian First League players
Ukrainian Second League players
Armenian First League players
Ukrainian expatriate footballers
Expatriate footballers in Armenia
Ukrainian expatriate sportspeople in Armenia